New Hampshire Route 123 (abbreviated NH 123) is a  secondary north–south state highway in southwestern New Hampshire. The southern terminus of the route is at the Massachusetts state line in Mason where, as Mason Road, the road continues as an unnumbered local road in the town of Townsend. Route logs, however, place the terminus at New Hampshire Route 12 in Walpole.

In Walpole, NH 123 runs in a wrong-way concurrency with NH 12 north–south alongside the Connecticut River, the water body that represents the border between New Hampshire and Vermont. For the entire length of the NH 12/NH 123 concurrency, NH 123 South is, in reality, heading north on the compass while NH 123 North is traveling to the south.

History

In October 2005, heavy flooding in the New Hampshire area forced the closure of NH 123 in two different locations. Both sections were subsequently rebuilt and reopened.

Major intersections

New Hampshire Route 123A

New Hampshire Route 123A (abbreviated NH 123A) is a designation held by two separate state highways in New Hampshire, United States. Although the two segments are not directly connected, they are linked by their parent route, New Hampshire Route 123.

Southern segment

The southern segment of NH 123A is a  secondary rural road that runs from the town of New Ipswich to the Massachusetts border.

The southern terminus of this segment is at the Massachusetts state line in New Ipswich. At this location, the road is locally named Ashburnham Road. The road continues into Massachusetts and becomes West Road in the town of Ashby. The northern terminus is at NH 123 and New Hampshire Route 124 in New Ipswich. At this location, NH 123A is locally named Main Street.

Northern segment

The northern segment of NH 123A is a  secondary rural east–west highway in western New Hampshire, running between the towns of Alstead and Marlow. The eastern terminus of this segment of NH 123A is at New Hampshire Route 10 in Marlow. The western terminus is at NH 123 in Alstead.  The road is the only numbered state highway in the town of Acworth, and is the main road through the village of South Acworth.

References

External links

 New Hampshire State Route 123 on Flickr
 New Hampshire State Route 123A on Flickr

123
Transportation in Hillsborough County, New Hampshire
Transportation in Cheshire County, New Hampshire